The sixteenth season of British science fiction television series Doctor Who, known collectively as The Key to Time, began on 2 September 1978 with The Ribos Operation, and ended with The Armageddon Factor. The arc was originally conceived by producer Graham Williams, who had proposed it as part of his application for the producer's job in 1976. The name refers to the powerful artefact, the segments of which are what the Fourth Doctor and his companions, Romana and K9, search for during the season. Anthony Read was the script editor until the final story, when Douglas Adams became the new script editor.

Synopsis 
A figure calling himself the White Guardian commissions the Doctor and K9, assisted by a new companion, the Time Lady Romana, to find the six segments of the Key to Time, a cosmic artefact resembling a perfect cube that maintains the equilibrium of the universe. Since it is too powerful for any single being to possess, it has been split into six different segments and scattered across space and time, disguised by the raw elemental power within them into any shape or size. However, since the forces balancing the universe are so upset, the White Guardian needs to recover the segments of the Key to stop the universe so that he can restore the balance. The White Guardian also warns the Doctor of the Black Guardian, who also wishes to obtain the Key to Time for his own purposes. In the final episode, the Black Guardian, disguised as the White Guardian, attempts to take the Key from the Doctor. However, the Doctor sees through the figure's charade and orders the segments of the Key to Time to once again become scattered across all of time and space, bar the sixth, which he reinstates as Princess Astra. Afterward, the Doctor decides to install a device called a randomiser into the TARDIS' navigation system for a period of time to make his following voyages unpredictable to evade the Black Guardian.

The six segments
The first segment is disguised as a lump of Jethrik on the planet Ribos. 
The second is the planet Calufrax, shrunk to miniature size by the space-hopping pirate planet Zanak. 
The third is the Great Seal of Diplos, which has been stolen by a criminal of that planet. 
The fourth is part of a statue on the planet Tara. 
The fifth has been consumed by the squid Kroll, causing it to turn into a gigantic monster. 
The final segment is a female humanoid – Princess Astra.

Casting

Main cast 
 Tom Baker as the Fourth Doctor
 Mary Tamm as Romana
 John Leeson as Voice of K9

Guest Cast 
 Valentine Dyall as the Black Guardian

Tom Baker continued his role as The Fourth Doctor, and saw the introduction of Romana played by Mary Tamm. This season was the only one to feature Tamm as the first incarnation of Romana, as Tamm left the programme after only one season because she felt that the character had reverted to the traditional assistant role and could not be developed further. The second incarnation, played by Lalla Ward (who also appeared in this season as Princess Astra), began her run in the first serial of the next season (Destiny of the Daleks).

Serials 

Douglas Adams took over as script editor from Anthony Read for The Armageddon Factor. Season 16 consists of one long story arc encompassing six separate, linked stories.

Broadcast
The Key to Time was broadcast from 2 September 1978 to 24 February 1979.

Home media

VHS releases

DVD and Blu-ray releases

In print

References

Bibliography
 

1978 British television seasons
1979 British television seasons
Season 16
Season 16
16
Fictional cubes